Ambrosio Boccanegra (died 1373)  was a Castilian sailor of Genoese origin from the Boccanegra family. He was the nephew of Simone Boccanegra, the first Doge of Genoa, son of Egidio Bocanegra, who in 1341 went to Castile with a fleet in support of King Alfonso XI of Castile. He commanded the Castilian forces in their defeat of the English fleet at the Battle of La Rochelle in 1372.

References

Year of birth unknown
1373 deaths
14th-century Genoese people
14th-century Castilians
Italian sailors
Spanish admirals
Ambrosio